Svetoslav Gotsev (born 31 August 1990 in Breznik, Bulgaria) is a Bulgarian male volleyball player.

He was a member of the Bulgaria men's national volleyball team at the 2014 FIVB Volleyball Men's World Championship in Poland. He played for Dobrudja 07.

References

1990 births
Living people
Bulgarian men's volleyball players
Place of birth missing (living people)
Volleyball players at the 2015 European Games
European Games medalists in volleyball
European Games silver medalists for Bulgaria
Bulgarian expatriate sportspeople in Germany
Bulgarian expatriate sportspeople in Italy
Expatriate volleyball players in Germany
Expatriate volleyball players in Iran
Expatriate volleyball players in Italy
Blu Volley Verona players